Graellsia isabellae, the Spanish moon moth, is in the silkmoth family Saturniidae. It is the only species in the monotypic genus Graellsia. The species was first described by Mariano de la Paz Graells y de la Agüera in 1849 and the genus was erected by Augustus Radcliffe Grote in 1896.

Range
The moth is native to Spain and France. They live high up in the Alps and the Pyrenees, where climates are generally cooler and drier. Interestingly, they have been found in Switzerland, where they are not native but instead probably further generations of captive moths. They are relics originating from the ice age or beyond.   It is thought that their habitat is a refuge location. This means that for the past few millions of years, while the climate of Europe has drastically changed, the conditions in the small  areas in the Alps and Pyrenees have remained stable, and never changed, allowing the small remnant populations of this moth to survive for thousands of years in these small habitats. 
They are split off from the lineage of 'Moon Moths', genus Actias.

Lifecycle
At the end of April and beginning of May the moth begins to hatch after overwintering in the cocoon. 
Normally moths from the same parental line won't copulate, so it is necessary to take account of this when the moth is bred in captivity.
After copulation the female lays about 100 to 150 eggs on the favoured food plant, pines.
The larva hatch after 1 to  weeks and begin to eat the very hard pine needles.
It takes about one and a half months for the caterpillars to reach the last instar. 
In the last instar the caterpillars go down from the tree to pupate under leaves on the ground. In this stage the pupae in the cocoon overwinter until the next spring.

Host plants 
The caterpillar primarily eats the needles of pine trees, more specifically Pinus nigra and Pinus sylvestris (genus Pinus). It appears to have difficulty adopting to non-native pine species as a host even within the genus Pinus
.

Life cycle

Hybrid
Graellsia isabellae × Actias selene is a hybrid of the Spanish moon moth and the Indian moon moth (Actias selene).

References

 World Conservation Monitoring Centre 1996.  Graellsia isabelae. 2006 IUCN Red List of Threatened Species. Retrieved 31 July 2007.

External links

 "Actias isabellae (Graells, 1849)". Moths and Butterflies of Europe and North Africa.
 
"06791 Actias isabellae (Graells, 1849) - Isabellaspinner". Lepiforum e.V.

Saturniinae
Moths described in 1849
Moths of Europe